Remember This may refer to:

Television
Remember This?, a TV game show
Remember This, a 2002 episode of the UK TV series Coupling; see List of Coupling episodes

Music
Remember This (Artist vs. Poet album), 2012
Remember This, a 2003 album by Gordon Giltrap
"Remember This", song by Grady Martin And His Winging Strings, 1955
"Remember This", song by Dolly Mixture, 1983
"Remember This" (song), song by the Jonas Brothers, 2021